Giovanni Angelo (ca. 1620 - ca. 1650), better known as Angeluccio, was an Italian or Flemish landscape artist. A prominent pupil of Claude Lorrain, he remained active in Rome around 1645-1650 and was an eminent member of Bamboccianti, from which he acquainted and befriended fellow artist Michelangelo Cerquozzi with whom he often collaborated. He is regarded as an artist of considerable talent and his works are often mistaken for his master's.

According to Pascoli, who was the only biographer who wrote about him in his biography of Claude Lorrain, Angeluccio was the most exceptional among all of Claude Lorrain's pupils. Unfortunately, Angeluccio died young and was able to only produce a modest number of works. His entire heritage consists of 25 paintings and 35 drawings, dated 1640–1650. In certain paintings, Claude Lorrain's influence is noticeable. In Landscape with Figures and Bridge, his earlier work, it is possible to observe Angeluccio directly borrowing Claude's elements such as centrally placed foreground figures framed by trees in the middle ground, which in turn stand before a bridge and a distant vista.

While Claude Lorrain's influence on Angeluccio's style was prominent, he was not a mere imitator. Influenced also by Dutch painters such as Swanevelt and Jan Both, his paintings are characterized by a blue-green tonality that was typical of Dutch and Flemish artists. His typical compositional characteristics are the rendering of a spatial depth, the showing of the horizon through an aperture in the dense foliage of the large trees, the domination of landscape over the relatively tiny figures, and the intense play of light and shadow. This blending of styles made his works unique and distinguishable.

References

Year of birth unknown
Year of death unknown
17th-century Italian painters
Italian male painters